Nepomuceno is a second name and surname, meaning "of Nepomuk". Notable people with the surname include:

Alberto Nepomuceno (1864–1920), Brazilian composer and conductor
Daniel Nepomuceno Navarro (born 1991), American soccer player 
David Nepomuceno (1900–1939), Filipino sprinter
Gevaro Nepomuceno (born 1992), Curaçaoan footballer
Giovanni Nepomuceno Della Croce (1736–1819), Italian painter
José Nepomuceno (1893–1959), Filipino film directors and producer
Juan Nepomuceno Álvarez (1790–1867), Former president of Mexico
Juan Nepomuceno Fernández Lindo (1790–1857), Honduran politician
Juan Nepomuceno Machado, Filipino-born Mexican merchant
Juan Nepomuceno Rencoret (1856-?), Chilean doctor
Juan Nepomuceno de Quesada (1738–1798), Spanish military officer
Juan Nepomuceno Solá (1751–1819), Argentine Catholic priest
Juan Nepomuceno Zegrí Moreno (1831–1905), Spanish Roman Catholic priest
Pablo Diego José Francisco de Paula Juan Nepomuceno María de los Remedios Cipriano de la Santísima Trinidad Ruiz y Picasso (1881-1973), Spanish artist
Paeng Nepomuceno (born 1957), Filipino bowler and coach
Willie Nepomuceno, Filipino satirist and public intellectual

See also
 John of Nepomuk (c. 1345 – 1393), Bohemian saint and priest, origin of the name.